Lycée Lyautey is a French institution of secondary education located in Casablanca, Morocco. It is composed of a collège (middle school) and a lycée (high school), and belongs to the Académie de Bordeaux, an educational administrative district in France. The school was named after Marshal Louis Hubert Gonzalve Lyautey who was the first French Resident General in Morocco from 1912 to 1925, at the beginning of the French protectorate in Morocco.

Lycée Lyautey is the largest of the 32 academic institutions administered directly by the Agency for French Education Abroad (AEFE) in Morocco, and it is the second largest directly-administered AEFE institution in the world. 

With approximately 3,458 students (1,582 of whom hold French nationality) and 257 teachers, it is the second-largest French educational institution in Morocco, after Lycée Louis-Massignon, which is administered by the French Mission. The average individual class size at Lycée Lyautey is 29 students.

History

Foundation 
Work on the old Lycée Lyautey, then known as the "Grand Lycée" (now Lycée Mohammed V), on Mers Sultan Avenue (now March 2 Avenue), began in 1919. The school was inaugurated in 1921. In 1929, the "Petit Lycée" (now the Ibn Toumart School) received elementary school students, as well as middle school students from 1933.

At the end of the colonial period, the cession of properties to the Moroccan government was organized. At this time, the Grand Lycée became the current Lycée Mohammed V, while the Petit Lycée became the Ibn Toumart School.

Current campus 
The current Lycée Lyautey building was built on the site of the former French military camp Turpin. Construction started in 1959, and the school was inaugurated in November of 1963.  In 1965, the school annexed the neighboring land of the former French military camp Beaulieu, which already possessed a number of athletic installations. 

In 1970, Maurice Schumann, French minister of foreign affairs at the time under Georges Pompidou, wrote in the Lycée Lyautey guestbook:
« Hommage aux enseignants et au proviseur du plus grand lycée d’un empire spirituel : l’empire de la francophonie»
"Homage to the teachers and to the director of the grandest lycée of a spiritual empire: the empire of the francophone world."

Courses

 General
 French literature
 Mathematics
 History
 Geography
 Earth sciences and Life sciences
 Physics
 Technology
 Visual arts
 Sports
 Social sciences
 Music (only for the classes of sixth and fifth grades)
 Languages:
 French
 Arabic
 English
 Spanish
 German
 Optional subjects:
 Latin
 Film Studies
 Fine arts
 Courses of the second cycle:
 Literature
 Philosophy
 Economics
 Sociology
 Management
 Law
 English Literature

Notable alumni

 David Galula (1919-1967), French military officer and scholar
 Gad Elmaleh, humorist and comedian
 Jean Reno, comedian (real name Juan Moreno y Herrera Jiménez: www.imdb.com/name/nm0000606/)
 Fouad Laroui, economist and writer
 Laïla Marrakchi, movie director and director of Marock
 Mehdi Ben Barka, politician
 Mahdi ElMandjra, futurist, sociologist and economist
 Driss Chraïbi, Moroccan writer
 Philippe-Joseph Salazar
 Sidney Toledano, president and chief executive officer of Christian Dior Couture
 Eric Besson   French minister
 Just Fontaine, French football player and manager
 Ali Benmakhlouf, philosopher, writer and professor
 [Zghayba], Moroccan Minister of Industry and Trade and former president of Al Akhawayn University in Ifrane. Zghayba also owns the majority of land in Sidi Slimane, and currently msa7b m3a Racha

References

Much of the content of this article comes from the equivalent French-language Wikipedia article, accessed May 29, 2006.

External links
 Official website
 History.
 Site of the Embassy of France in Morocco
 List of professors by course

 http://www.lyceefr.org/lyautey/

Lyautey
French international schools in Casablanca